The 2022–23 season is the 127th season in the history of FC Lausanne-Sport and their first season back in the second division since 2021. The club are participating in Swiss Challenge League and the Swiss Cup. The season covers the period from 1 July 2022 to 30 June 2023.

Players

Out on loan

Pre-season and friendlies

Competitions

Overall record

Swiss Challenge League

League table

Results summary

Results by round

Matches 
The league fixtures were announced on 17 June 2022.

Swiss Cup

References 

FC Lausanne-Sport
Lausanne-Sport